Steske is a small settlement in western Slovenia in the Municipality of Nova Gorica. It is located near the village of Branik in the Branik Valley, part of Vipava Valley.

Geography

The main part of Steske lies along the Branica River, a tributary of the Vipava River. The hamlet of Pekel lies to the northwest along the Vipava. Vrh Hill rises to the northeast, Saint Catherine's Hill to the east, and Kozjak Hill to the southwest. A 19th-century stone bridge spans the Branica immediately west of the main part of the village.

History

The counts of Lanthieri built a mill along the Vipava River in Pekel in 1739. It was used by farmers from the lower Vipava Valley and the Lower Karst Plateau. A smithy was built next to it in the 19th century to produce agricultural implements, and later on a sawmill was added.

The overpass crossing the railroad west of the village was built by the Allied Military Government, which administered Zone A of the Julian March from 1945 to 1947.

References

External links

Steske on Geopedia

Populated places in the City Municipality of Nova Gorica